FabricLive.19 is a DJ mix compilation album by the Freestylers, as part of the FabricLive Mix Series.

Track listing
  The Freestylers - "Boomblast (Deekline & Wizard Remix)" - Against the Grain - 7:10
  DJ Mutiny & Shopliftas - "Daily Operation" - Rat Records – 2:33
  The Breakfastaz - "Midnight" - All Ears Music – 4:52
  SCAM - "Killer" - Deepcut – 3:42
  Paradox 3000 - "Let There Be Light" - Punk Funk – 4:38
  Baobinga - "The Bashment Track" - Cyberfunk – 2:39
  Merka - "Holding On" - Re:connect – 2:19
  NAPT - "Line Like This" (ft. Sharkey P) - Rat Records – 2:45
  Jammin' - "Broken Point" - Bingo Beats – 2:46
  SCAM vs the Freestylers - "Put Up Your Hands" - Deepcut – 3:16
  The Freestylers - "Warrior Charge (Breakfastaz Remix)" - Against the Grain – 3:39
  NAPT - "Soul Surviving" - Plastic Raygun – 2:22
  The Breakfastaz - "Kick It" - Mob Records – 3:23
  Enzyme - "Bandwagon 92s" - 2 Fresh Records – 0:34
  Phuture Assassins - "Forever" - Warehouse Wax – 2:33
  The Breakfastaz - "Spit It Out" - Cyberfunk – 2:20
  Teebone ft. MC Kie and MC Sparks - "Fly Bi" - Solid City Records – 1:09
  Azzido Da Bass - "Dooms Night (Timo Maas Remix)" - Edel Records – 2:53
  Journeyman vs Barrcode - "Time to Unite" - Born Idle Records – 3:32
  SCAM vs the Freestylers - "Acid Love" - Deepcut – 3:56
  Ed 209 - "Infectious" - Wireframe Records – 3:02
  Drumattic Twins - "Rock Steady" - Finger Lickin' – 2:43
  NAPT ft. Julie Morrison - "Take Me Away 2004 (Exclusive VIP Mix)" - Napt – 4:52

References

External links 
Fabric: FabricLive.19

Freestylers albums
2004 compilation albums